James M. Kelly (born July 5, 1960) is a Washington, D.C. lobbyist and a former Maryland politician. He was first elected in 1994 to represent District 9B, which covers a portion of Baltimore County, Maryland. An officer in the United States Coast Guard Reserve, he became Assistant Commandant for Reserve in Washington, DC, on June 14, 2021.

Background
Kelly was first elected in 1994 when he defeated Democrat Stephen W. Lafferty for the new District 9B seat. Previously, there was a District 9 that was served by Gerry L. Brewster, John J. Bishop, and Martha Scanlan Klima. Klima went on to win District 9A's election.  In the 1998 Republican primary election, Kelly was unchallenged.  Furthermore, he was unchallenged in the general election, as well.

Kelly resigned from his position in 2001 and was replaced by his wife, Melissa J. Kelly, by Governor Parris Glendening. Kelly resigned his position as he was appointed by President George W. Bush to serve in the White House as his Special Assistant for Intergovernmental Affairs.

Education
Kelly Attended Towson High School in Towson, Maryland.  After serving time in the military, Kelly joined the Maryland State Police and went to college, receiving his B.S. in business administration and finance from the University of Maryland University College in 1988.

While working in the White House, Kelly earned his Master of Arts degree in National Security and Strategic Studies through the U.S. Naval War College.

Career
As mentioned previously, Kelly enlisted in U.S. Coast Guard Reserves in 1977 and attended Officer Candidate School, graduating in 1990.  He has since been promoted to rear admiral.  Kelly was also a Maryland State Trooper for the Maryland State Police from 1984 until 1989.

Kelly worked as a commercial lending and troubled-loan restructuring officer from 1989 until 1994. He was a small business owner from 1995 until 1997.  In 2001, Kelly was hired as senior advisor to Undersecretary for Memorial Affairs for the U.S. Department of Veterans Affairs.

Kelly received numerous awards during his career.  He is a member of the Reserve Officers Association and the Maryland Troopers Association.  He was a recipient of the Award for Duty Beyond the Call of Duty as Maryland State Trooper, which he received in 1985. He also received the award for Outstanding Junior Officer from the U.S. Coast Guard Marine Safety Office in 1994. He holds a Certificate of Achievement from the Maryland Federation of College Republicans  in 1995. In 1996, he was selected as Legislator of the Year by the Alliance for the Mentally Ill . Additionally, he was selected as Outstanding Junior Officer in entire Fifth District from the U.S. Coast Guard in 1997. Also in 1997, Kelly received the Certificate of Achievement from the Maryland Association of Psychiatric Support Services.

In 2001, as mentioned previously, Kelly was tapped by President Bush to work for the White House.  Kelly was responsible for briefing the President on state, local, and tribal issues throughout the United States.

In 2005, together with Ken Meyer, Duane Parde and Daniel J. Ostergaard, he opened a lobbying firm in DC.

Election results
1998 Race for Maryland House of Delegates – District 9B
Voters to choose one:
{| class="wikitable"
!Name
!Votes
!Percent
!Outcome
|-
|-
|James M. Kelly, Rep.
|9,514
|  100%
|   Won
|}

1994 Race for Maryland House of Delegates – District 9B
Voters to choose one:
{| class="wikitable"
!Name
!Votes
!Percent
!Outcome
|-
|-
|James M. Kelly, Rep.
|7,343
|  56%
|   Won
|-
|-
|Stephen W. Lafferty, Dem..
|5,823
|  44%
|   Lost
|}

References and notes

External links
http://www.msa.md.gov/msa/mdmanual/06hse/former/html/msa12252.html

1960 births
Living people
Politicians from Cleveland
People from Towson, Maryland
Towson High School alumni
United States Coast Guard reservists
American state police officers
University of Maryland Global Campus alumni
Republican Party members of the Maryland House of Delegates
Assistants to the President of the United States
Naval War College alumni
United States Coast Guard admirals